This is a list of World Championships medalists in sailing in the radio sailing classes recognised by the International Radio Sailing Association and World Sailing.

International One Metre

International Marblehead

International Ten Rater

International A Class

References

Radio Sailing